Mary Nolan may refer to:
Mary Nolan (1902–1948), American Actress
Mary Nolan (politician) (born 1954), American Democratic politician
Mary Nolan (artist) (1926–2016), Australian ceramicist, painter and photographer
Mary A. Nolan (1842–1925), American suffragist